The Island is a 2018 Nigerian action film directed by Toka McBaror. The film was co-produced by Daniel Cole Chiori and Freda Francis and stars Nollywood actors and actress such as Femi Adebayo, Segun Arinze, Sukanmi Bahlofin, Sambasa Nzeribe.

Plot
Hamza (Sambasa Nzeribe), a colonel in the army, intercepts a conversation regarding a weapon sales deal between an unknown terrorist and an agent, and while trying to get the intel to his commanding officer he makes a shocking discovery.

Cast
 Femi Adebayo as Kola
 Segun Arinze as Major Gata
 Sukanmi Bahlofin as Bishop
 Tokunbor Idowu as Sandra
 Sambasa Nzeribe as Hamza
 Anita Osikhena Osikweme as Grace

Production
The film was produced by Achievas Entertainment Limited.

Release
The movie was initially produced with the title Death Island and uploaded  November 2017 on YouTube by Fresh Nigerian Movie Trailers.  However, the official trailer was released in May 2018, and the actual release by Achievas Entertainment on August 10, 2018.

Reception
Speaking ahead of the movie's official release after the trailer's release which he patronized on social media, Innocent Idibia, a popular Nigerian singer commented about the film that it was a new era for the Nollywood.

In Toronto, Canada, the film won several awards at the TINFF 2018 Nollywood Movie awards, including Best African Film award, Best Nollywood Actress award won by Tokunbo Idowu also known as TBoss), Best Supporting Actor award won by Segun Arinze, and Best Nollywood Director award won by Toka McBaror. Earlier on, it was also nominated for the Best Feature Film, Best Producer, Best Editing, Best Photography and Best Cinematography award categories.

References

External links
 
 The Island on Netflix
 The Island on Film Freeway.
 The Island on Letterboxd
 The Island on Télérama
 The Island on IUVITS MEDIA SALES

2018 films
English-language Nigerian films
Nigerian action films
2010s English-language films